Nica's Tempo is the most common latter-day title of an album by the Gigi Gryce Orchestra and Quartet, recorded and first released in late 1955. The title track is a reference to Nica de Koenigswarter (born Kathleen Annie Pannonica Rothschild) a.k.a. "The Bebop Baroness" or "The Jazz Baroness", a patron of jazz musicians such as Thelonious Monk and Charlie Parker.

The album was originally issued in late 1955 (Signal S 1201) in packaging that makes its title difficult to summarize. The side A label read Gigi Gryce Orchestra, while the side B label read Gigi Gryce Quartet; the back cover listed both titles. One Signal edition of the front cover simply read Gigi Gryce, while the other was titled with a list of 11 star players from the sessions, starting with Gigi Gryce and Thelonious Monk. The Signal Records masters were acquired by Savoy Records, who reissued this album circa 1958 as Nica's Tempo.

While side two is ostensibly by the "Gigi Gryce Quartet", its duration is dominated by three previously unrecorded compositions of Thelonious Monk, on which he is featured as the quartet's pianist.  Furthermore, the lineup is Gryce plus the same musicians that had recorded a 10" LP as the Thelonious Monk Trio a year earlier (Thelonious Monk Plays), making this arguably a Monk/Gryce quartet, playing under Gryce's name for contractual reasons. Author Robin D.G.Kelley, in the book Thelonious Monk: The Life and Times of an American Original, reports that the teaching, rehearsal and performance of these compositions were all directed by Monk. Kelley further describes:  It would be another year before Riverside Records recorded any original Monk compositions, for the album Brilliant Corners. These were, therefore, the only original compositions Monk recorded for release in 1955.

Track listing

Side 1 (by "Gigi Gryce Orchestra")

Side 2 (by "Gigi Gryce Quartet")

Personnel
Gigi Gryce – alto sax (all tracks)
Tracks 1, 2, 4, 6: Rudy Van Gelder Studio, Hackensack, New Jersey, October 22, 1955
Art Farmer – trumpet
Jimmy Cleveland – trombone
Gunther Schuller – french horn
Bill Barber – tuba
Danny Bank – baritone sax
Horace Silver – piano
Oscar Pettiford – bass
Kenny Clarke – drums
Tracks 3, 5: Rudy Van Gelder Studio, Hackensack, New Jersey, October 22, 1955
Art Farmer – trumpet
Eddie Bert – trombone
Julius Watkins – french horn
Bill Barber – tuba
Cecil Payne – baritone sax
Horace Silver – piano
Oscar Pettiford – bass
Art Blakey – drums
Ernestine Anderson – vocals
Tracks 7-10: Rudy Van Gelder Studio, Hackensack, New Jersey, October 15, 1955

Thelonious Monk – piano
Percy Heath – bass
Art Blakey – drums

References 

1955 albums
Gigi Gryce albums
Savoy Records albums
Albums recorded at Van Gelder Studio